Black Moon is a 1934 American pre-Code horror film directed by Roy William Neill and starring Jack Holt, Fay Wray, and Dorothy Burgess. It is based on a short story by Clements Ripley that first appeared in Hearst's International-Cosmopolitan. The film centers on a young woman who returns to the tropical island where her parents were murdered during a voodoo ritual with her daughter and nanny, only to become corrupted by the native's dark rituals.

Plot
A young girl, Juanita, finds her parents killed in a voodoo ritual on a distant tropical island.  She escapes with her life, but when she reaches adulthood, she feels compelled to return to the island, bringing her daughter and a nanny who takes care of the child. Once there, she goes to stay with her uncle who lives on the island.  She soon discovers that the natives, who had been using her for voodoo rituals when she was a child, now treat her as a voodoo goddess.  In this role, she begins leading their rituals.

Any attempt to fight Juanita's influence or to remove her from her position is met with violent force.  One person is found dead in a lava pit, while another is found hanged.  At one point, Juanita is so overcome by the voodoo curse that she offers her daughter up for sacrifice.  Juanita's businessman husband, Stephen, follows her to the island and attempts to travel into the jungle to rescue her, but finds her taking part in a sacrifice of an innocent woman.  Although he shoots the high priest of the tribe, Juanita completes the sacrifice herself.

Their high priest injured, the natives now plan to murder all of the white people on the island.  Stephen takes his daughter and two others into the fortified section of a plantation house. The natives succeed in capturing Stephen and his secretary, Gail, but they are eventually rescued. In the end, Stephen shoots and kills Juanita just as she is about to sacrifice her own daughter.

Cast
Cast adapted from the book Columbia Pictures Horror, Science Fiction and Fantasy Films.

Production
Black Moon was based on the novel by Clements Ripley which first appeared in Hearst's International-Cosmopolitan. Among the cast was Jack Holt, who was one of Columbia Pictures' most popular actors of the period and would continue to headline their pictures up until the early 1940s.  The director, Roy William Neill had been directing films since 1916 and joined Columbia in 1930, where he directed the studios films The Menace, The Ninth Guest (1934)  and The Black Room (1935).

The film began production on April 10, 1934 and finished on May 3, 1934.

Release
Black Moon was released on June 15, 1934. It was distributed by Columbia Pictures Corp.

Reception
From contemporary reviews, A.D.S. of The New York Times commented that the film was "strictly studio-made, is admirably equipped to throw a double-bar-relled scare into the innocent entertainment-hunter." while stating that "There are times when the reassuring Hollywood touch appears in the picture. For example, the native ritual which precedes the main or throat-cutting event has a precision in the dance routines and mass singing that suggests the Busby Berkeley touch." A reviewer in Variety commented that direction in Black Moon was "commednable and the acting is good, but the scenario possesses dubious elements"

References

Sources

External links

 
 
 
 
 

1934 horror films
1934 films
American black-and-white films
American horror films
Columbia Pictures films
Films directed by Roy William Neill
Films about Voodoo
Films set on islands
1930s English-language films
1930s American films